Conway High School is a public school located in Conway, South Carolina at 2301 Church Street. It is one of nine high schools in the Horry County School District. The school colors are forest green and gold, and its athletic teams are known as the "Tigers."

Notable alumni
 Bryan Edwards, American football player
 Kenneth Earl "Junior" Hemingway, Jr., American football player
 Grant Holmes, American baseball player
 Allen Patrick, American football player
 Luke Rankin, S.C. State Senator
 Sheri Reynolds, playwright, author
 Perry Richardson, musician, bassist for FireHouse
 Buddy Sasser, American football player, coach, college athletics administrator

References

External links
 

Public high schools in South Carolina
Schools in Horry County, South Carolina
Buildings and structures in Conway, South Carolina
1968 establishments in South Carolina
Educational institutions established in 1968